The Ten Great Buildings are ten public buildings that were built in Beijing in 1959, to commemorate the tenth anniversary of the founding of the People's Republic of China. They were part of an architecture and urbanism initiative of Chairman Mao's Great Leap Forward; most of the buildings were largely completed in a time span of ten months, by the deadline of 1 October 1959. In addition to the construction of these buildings, there was also an expansion of Tiananmen square, and a campaign of art commissions to decorate the majority of the buildings by the time of their completion. Two subsequent art campaigns for these buildings were conducted in 1961, and 1964–1965.

The buildings were designed by members of the Beijing Institute of Architectural Design, working with the Beijing Planning Bureau and the Ministry of Construction.  The architects used an austere combination of three basic styles: modernism in the international style, Socialist realism as expressed in Stalinist architecture, and a form of historicism based on traditional Chinese architecture.  

The Ten Great Buildings transformed Beijing.  These monumental new buildings, constructed on a grand scale and providing modern facilities and services, helped to establish and celebrate an image of Mao Zedong's "New China".  They redefined Beijing as modern and up-to-date, a part of the international socialist vision of the future, and yet still distinctively Chinese; perhaps most important, as a city comparable to other globally important "superpower" capitals such as London, Washington, D.C., and Moscow.

More recently, lists have been compiled promoting the ten great buildings of Beijing constructed during the 1980s, 1990s, and 2000s (to date); although the original 1959 list is still considered pre-eminent and definitive of the concept.

The buildings

The ten buildings are:
The Great Hall of the People – Located on the western edge of Tiananmen Square, the Great Hall of the People houses China's top legislative body, the National People's Congress, and is also used for other ceremonial activities.
The National Museum of China – Originally known as the China Revolutionary History Museum, this building is located on the eastern edge of Tiananmen Square.
The Cultural Palace of Nationalities – Located on the north side of West Chang'an Avenue, the Nationalities Cultural Palace is a medium rise building incorporating traditional Chinese design elements. It has won a number of awards as an example of modern Chinese-style design.
The Beijing railway station – Designed by architects Yang Tingbao and Chen Deng'ao, Beijing railway station was the largest modern passenger rail terminal in China at the time of construction. Since its construction, it has served as the terminal of a number of domestic and international services, including services to Moscow, Ulan Bator, and Pyongyang. It replaced the old Beijing railway station at Qianmen, near Tiananmen Square, which had been built in 1901. 
The Workers' Stadium – The multi-purpose stadium was last renovated in 2004 and now has a capacity of 66,161. It hosted the first National Games of the People's Republic of China.
The Diaoyutai State Guesthouse – The hotel and guesthouse complex is built on the site of an 800-year-old garden dating back to the Jin Dynasty. The building incorporates design elements of traditional Chinese garden architecture. Formerly reserved for visiting dignitaries and Party officials (most famously Jiang Qing, Madame Mao), the guesthouse is now open to the public
The Minzu Hotel – The Minzu Hotel is located on West Chang'an Avenue. It has hosted numerous foreign delegations, and is often used for press conferences.
The Overseas Chinese Hotel – The original Overseas Chinese Hotel was demolished in the 1990s. A new building on the same site is now part of the Prime Hotel chain.
The Chinese People's Revolutionary Military Museum – Located on Fuxing Road in Beijing, this is the only large, comprehensive war museum in China. Displays focus on wars of the twentieth century, especially the Chinese Civil War, but also cover other ancient and modern warfare and weapons. The main building is seven storeys high at the centre, and is topped by a central steeple. Two four-storey side wings extend on either side.

Art program
The art program to coincide with the construction of the Ten Great Buildings was vast in its scope—including some 345 paintings, murals, and sculptures to decorate the new buildings. Many were done in the modes of traditional Chinese painting, and others were in the socialist realist style. The Great Hall of the People received much of the commission's attention but the campaign was not limited to this building. One aspect of the decoration in the Great Hall was the correlation of rooms for representatives from each province with regional art by artists from these respective provinces. The artistic centerpiece of this building was a large painting by Fu Baoshi and Guan Shanyue for the main staircase. Entitled This Land So Rich in Beauty, it is one of the largest paintings on paper in China, with dimensions of 5.5 by 9 meters. The painting was based on the poem Ode to Snow by Mao Zedong, and includes a transcription of Mao's calligraphy of the title.

Architecture
The architecture of the Ten Great Buildings is a composite of factors based in modernism, communism, and historicism. Chinese architecture at the time was shaped by review of its own historical models mixed with external influences. Debate was vigorous in publications such as the Architectural Journal prior to the constructions, and history, modernity and influence were being conceptualized and reconsidered. A criticism of this initiative is that while creating facilities for political, and cultural institutions, these public projects failed to provide for a needed increase in housing, however, a housing surge would occur in the country later in the century. Modern architecture brought to China, as it had to the west, a new economic and rational manner of building, and the modernist buildings of the group were the least decorated by the public art campaign. Examples of this are the Workers' Stadium, the Minzu Hotel, and the Overseas Chinese Hotel. The modernist tenets of function and structure were realized in these buildings, yet these were attributed both to western capitalist influences and the Soviet notion of the proletariat. The Soviet architecture inspired examples of the Ten Buildings are the Great Hall of the People, the National Museum of China, and the Chinese People's Revolutionary Military Museum. The Great Hall of the People and the National Museum of China across from it on the square continue the numerology of tens—each having ten freestanding columns in their facades. The architectural aspects of the traditionally inspired buildings included large and heavy roofs laden with ceramic tiles. These were often stacked in multiple layers recalling the towering form of the pagoda. Another feature is upturned corners and curved ridges on hipped edges. Beneath these thick composite toppings are layers of beams, and brackets known as dougong. Examples of this type of architecture among the Ten Great Constructions are the Beijing railway station, the Nationalities Cultural Palace, and the National Agriculture Exhibition Hall.

See also
Urban Planning Society of China
Chinese architecture
Grands Projets of François Mitterrand

References

External links
 
 History of The Ten Great Buildings

Buildings and structures in Beijing
Urban planning in China
Buildings and structures completed in 1959